Streptognathodus is an extinct genus of conodonts from the Late Carboniferous to Early Permian.

Use in stratigraphy

Late Carboniferous 
The top of the Kasimovian stage is close to the first appearance of Streptognathodus zethus. The golden spike for the Kasimovian stage has not yet been assigned (in 2008).

The Kasimovian is subdivided into three conodont biozones:
Idiognathodus toretzianus Zone
Idiognathodus sagittatus Zone
Streptognathodus excelsus and Streptognathodus makhlinae Zone

The base of the Gzhelian is at the first appearance of Streptognathodus zethus.  The top of the stage (also the top base of the Silesian and the base of the Permian system) is at the first appearance of Streptognathodus isolatus within the Streptognathus "wabaunsensis" chronocline.

The Gzhelian stage is subdivided into five biozones, based on the conodont genus Streptognathodus:
 Streptognathodus wabaunsensis and Streptognathodus bellus Zone
 Streptognathodus simplex Zone
 Streptognathodus virgilicus Zone
 Streptognathodus vitali Zone
 Streptognathodus simulator Zone

Early Permian 
The base of the Asselian stage is at the same time the base of the Cisuralian series and the Permian system. It is defined as the place in the stratigraphic record where fossils of the species Streptognathodus isolatus first appear. The global reference profile for the base (the GSSP or golden spike) is located in the valley of the Aidaralash River, near Aqtöbe in the Ural Mountains of Kazakhstan. The top of the Asselian stage (the base of the Sakmarian stage) is at the first appearance of the species Streptognathodus postfusus.

The Asselian contains five conodont biozones:
zone of Streptognathodus barskovi
zone of Streptognathodus postfusus
zone of Streptognathodus fusus
zone of Streptognathodus constrictus
zone of Streptognathodus isolatus

The base of the Sakmarian stage is laid with the first appearance of Streptognathodus postfusus in the fossil record. A global reference profile for the base had in 2009 not yet been appointed. The top of the Sakmarian (the base of the Artinskian) is defined as the place in the stratigraphic record where fossils of conodont species Sweetognathus whitei and Mesogondolella bisselli first appear.

References

External links 

 
 

Ozarkodinida genera
Carboniferous conodonts
Permian conodonts
Asselian life
Gzhelian life
Kasimovian life
Pennsylvanian first appearances
Cisuralian genus extinctions